August Johann Gottfried Bielenstein (– ) was a Baltic German linguist, folklorist, ethnographer, and theologian.

Bielenstein was born in Mitau (Jelgava), where he also died. His father was a lutheran curate and teacher Johann Gottfried Bielenstein. He spent his childhood in Jaunauce parish. Later he traveled to Germany and studied in gymnasium in Saxony.
He studied at the University of Halle (in Prussian Saxony) like numerous prominent pastors in the Baltic region, and received a doctorate in theology from the University of Dorpat in 1850. He was granted an honorary doctorate from the University of Königsberg in 1883. After his father's death Bielenstein took over his duties as a pastor in Jaunauce parish. In 1867 he became pastor in Dobele where he lived and worked until 1905. During Russian revolution of 1905 local revolutionists led by Dāvids Beika stormed his residence at Dobele German pastorat and burned his library and archive. After that Bielenstein resigned from his post and left Dobele. He lived his last years in his native Mitau (Jelgava). He had three daughters and six sons. One of his sons was architect Bernhard Bielenstein.

The editor of the major Latvian language newspaper Latviešu Avīzes and a member of the St. Petersburg Academy of Sciences, Bielenstein was the author of numerous major works on linguistics and ethnography, including Die lettische Sprache, nach ihren Lauten und Formen (The Latvian Language, Its Phonetics and Forms, 2 volumes, 1863–64) and Die Grenzen des lettischen Volksstammes und der lettischen Sprache in der Gegenwart und im 13. Jahrhundert (The Borders of the Latvian Tribes and the Latvian Language in the Present and in the 13th Century, 1892). He encouraged the collection of dainas, studied traditional wooden architecture, and examined castle mounds to identify them according to their description in ancient chronicles. Whilst Bielenstein made many seminal contributions to the study of the Latvian language and culture, he was also a fierce opponent of the Young Latvians and a staunch defender of the Baltic German tradition.
From 1864 until 1895 he was a president and later honorary president of Latvian Literary Society. In 1893 he became honorary member of Riga Latvian society.

See also 
 Latvian Literary Society
 List of Baltic German scientists

References 

1826 births
1907 deaths
People from Jelgava
People from Courland Governorate
Baltic-German people
19th-century German theologians
Martin Luther University of Halle-Wittenberg alumni
University of Tartu alumni
University of Königsberg alumni
20th-century German theologians
19th-century German male writers
19th-century German writers
German male non-fiction writers
19th-century linguists
German ethnographers